The term Greek legislative election, 2012, may refer to:

May 2012 Greek legislative election 
June 2012 Greek legislative election